Solaria was a modernist literary magazine published in Florence, Italy, between 1926 and 1936. The title is a reference to the city of sun. The magazine is known for its significant influence on young Italian writers.

History and profile
Solaria was established in Florence in 1926. The founders were Alessandro Bonsanti and Alberto Carocci. Its publisher was Edizioni di Solaria, and the magazine was published on a monthly basis. As of 1929 Giansiro Ferrata served as the co-editor of the magazine. Alessandro Bonsanti replaced him in the post in 1930 which he held until 1933.

The major goal of Solaria was to Europeanize Italian culture and to emphasize the contributions of Italian modernist writers such as Svevo and Federigo Tozzi to the European modernism. The magazine adopted a modernist approach. Solaria had an anti-fascist stance. The contributors of the magazine were mostly the short story writers. They included Alberto Carocci, Eugenio Montale, Elio Vittorini, Carlo Emilio Gadda. and Renato Poggioli. The novel of Elio Vittorini, Il garofano rosso, was first published in the magazine. The magazine also featured poems by young Italian artists, including Sandro Penna. It was harshly criticized by other Italian literary circles and magazines, including Il Selvaggio, Il Bargello and Il Frontespizio, due to its frequent coverage of the work by Jewish writers.

After producing a total of forty-one volumes Solaria ceased publication in 1936. The final issue was dated 1934, although it was published in 1936. In fact, it was censored by the fascist authorities partly due to the serialization of Elio Vittorini's novel, Il garofano rosso, in the magazine.

References

1926 establishments in Italy
1936 disestablishments in Italy
Anti-fascism in Italy
Banned magazines
Censorship in Italy
Defunct literary magazines published in Italy
Italian-language magazines
Magazines established in 1926
Magazines disestablished in 1936
Magazines published in Florence
Modernism
Monthly magazines published in Italy
Poetry literary magazines